Wallyford is a village near Musselburgh and approximately  east of Edinburgh in East Lothian, Scotland.

History

The village was initially populated by coal miners and later grew as an overspill/commuter town for workers in Musselburgh and Edinburgh. A tribute to the miners can be found marked on a stone through the main road (Salters Road) of the village. A coal mine at Wallyford was worked for the profit of Mary, Queen of Scots in 1563 and also supplied coal for her own fire at Holyrood Palace.

The village is overlooked by the restored Fa'side Castle which was destroyed by the English after the Battle of Pinkie in 1546. In 2016, construction began to regenerate the village. A new, replacement Primary School was completed in February 2019.  A new village high street/centre will be created alongside a legible hierarchy of roads and footpaths, maximising connections throughout but in particular to the Village Centre and Community Woodland.

Landmarks

Wallyford has a railway station with a Park and Ride facility, on the Edinburgh to North Berwick railway line, operated by ScotRail.

It has a primary/nursery school, playgroup, community centre, churches, library, post office and a Miners' social club.

Notable people
Sir William Binning of Wallyford (1627–1711) Lord Provost of Edinburgh 1675–1677.

Victorian writer Margaret Oliphant was born in Wallyford on 4 April 1828. Among her best-known works were Katie Stewart, The Carlingford Chronicles and Tales of the Seen and Unseen. She died in Wimbledon on 25 June 1897 and was buried in Eton Cemetery near Windsor.

Willie Park, Sr., the first and four-time winner of the Open Championship in golf, was born in Wallyford on 30 June 1833 and died on 25 July 1903.

Former footballer and football manager Jock Wallace, Jr. was born in Wallyford on 6 September 1935. He went on to have a successful career as manager of Rangers.

See also
List of places in East Lothian

References

External links

2001 Census Data (PDF)

 
Villages in East Lothian
Mining communities in Scotland